Rogério Dutra da Silva was the defending champion, but Ricardo Hocevar eliminated him in the quarterfinals.

4th seed Júlio Silva won the tournament, defeating Christian Lindell, Marcelo Demoliner, Eládio Ribeiro Neto, Ricardo Hocevar and Gastão Elias in the final.

Seeds

Draw

Finals

Top half

Bottom half

References
 Main Draw
 Qualifying Draw

BH Tennis Open International Cup - Singles
BH Tennis Open International Cup